Buckow ( or ) is a town in the Märkisch-Oderland district, in Brandenburg, Germany. The water cure resort is the administrative seat of the Amt (municipal association) Märkische Schweiz and located in the centre of the eponymous hill range, since 1990 part of the Märkische Schweiz Nature Park protected area.

Geography

The town is situated in a glacial trough between the Berlin Urstromtal in the southwest and the Oder Valley in the northeast, crossed by the Stobber River with its source in the Rotes Luch lowland. The trough comprises several lakes, of which Schermützelsee west of the town centre is the largest.

Overview
The town arose at the site of a former Slavic (Wendish) settlement which according to archaeological findings possibly arose in the mid 9th century, its name referring to the Slavic: buk, "beech". The Märkische Schweiz area was part of Lubusz Land held by Prince Mieszko I of Poland in the late 10th century, which later formed the northwestern part of the Duchy of Silesia. In 1224 the Piast duke Henry I the Bearded granted large estates to the Cistercian monks of Lubiąż (Leubus) and Trzebnica (Trebnitz) Abbey and had the lands settled with German-speaking colonists.

From about 1249/50 the Ascanian margraves of Brandenburg took control over Lubusz Land, initially rivalling with the Prince-Archbishops of Magdeburg. Buchowe was first mentioned in a 1253 deed issued by Archbishop Rudolf von Dingelstädt. It is also mentioned in the 1375 land register of Emperor Charles IV and already is called an oppidum in a 1405 purchase contract.

Buckow was devastated during a Hussite campaign on 17 April 1432. The House of Hohenzollern elector Frederick II of Brandenburg vested the farming citizens with market rights in 1465. During early modern times, Buckow evolved to a centre of hop growing and brewing. The town privileges were officially confirmed in 1550.

In the 17th century the estates were held by the Pfuel noble family and in 1688 were acquired by the Brandenburgian field marshal Heino Heinrich von Flemming, who had the Baroque Buckow Castle erected, which, rebuilt in a 19th-century Neoclassical style according to plans designed by Karl Friedrich Schinkel, was heavily damaged in World War II and demolished in 1948. The extended English landscape gardens have been preserved.

With the opening of the Prussian Eastern Railway station at neighbouring Müncheberg in 1865, followed by a direct narrow gauge railway connection to Buckow in 1897, the town due to its picturesque setting became a popular destination for daytrippers from Berlin and several well-off families had summer cottages erected. The writer Egon Kisch spent holidays here, as did the artist John Heartfield. From 1952 Bertolt Brecht and Helene Weigel had their summer residence in Buckow, where Brecht wrote his Buckow Elegies in response to the Uprising of 1953 in East Germany. The villa today is a memorial site and a place for readings.

Politics

Seats in the municipal assembly (Stadtverordnetenversammlung) as of 2014 local elections:
Christian Democratic Union (CDU): 4
Social Democratic Party of Germany (SPD): 3
The Left (Die Linke): 2
Pro Zukunft (Independent): 1

Demography

International relations

Buckow is twinned with:
  Brilon, Germany
  Łagów, Świebodzin County, Poland
  Adare (Áth Dara), Ireland

Personalities 

 Theodor Fontane (1819-1898), author, wrote in the Wanderungen durch die Mark Brandenburg in volume 2 "The Oderland" about Buckow
 Bertolt Brecht (1898-1956), writer, lived in Buckow in 1952-1956
 Helene Weigel, (1900-1971), actress, lived in Buckow in 1952-1971
 Ralf Dahrendorf (1929-2009), sociologist and politician, attended a boarding school in Buckow from 1941 to 1944

References

External links

 Brecht-Weigel-Haus

Localities in Märkisch-Oderland